César Vidal Manzanares (Madrid, May 9, 1958) is a far-right Spanish radio host, lawyer, and author.

Early life 
Vidal was born in Madrid on May 9, 1958 in the Puente de Vallecas neighborhood. He attended high school at the Escuelas Pías de San Antón. He is the brother of jurist and writer .

Career 
He has a PhD in Law from Alfonso X El Sabio University, in Theology and Philosophy by Logos University, where he is a member of the Board of Regents. 

He is also a member of the Executive Council of the Inter-American Institute for Democracy. He is also member of the Academia Norteamericana de la Lengua Española (North American Academy of the Spanish Language) since 2015. He has been collaborator of several media, such as El Mundo, Diario 16, Periodico de Aragon and La Razón. He hosted the radio show La Linterna on Cadena COPE from 2004 to 2009. That year he quit COPE to launch with Federico Jiménez Losantos a radio station, esRadio. In 2013 he abandoned that project too, due to disagreements with Federico Jiménez Losantos.[5] Since 2014 he is the host of La Voz, a radio program broadcast from the United States. 

He specializes in historical studies about totalitarian regimes and history of religions. His book El Holocausto (The Holocaust) is the first complete history of the Holocaust written by a Spaniard. His book Las Brigadas Internacionales (The International Brigades) has been described by the American historian, Stanley G. Payne, as "the most complete book about the International Brigades published in any language, in any time, and in any place." Payne also said that La Guerra Que Ganó Franco (The War that Franco Won) "is the best military history of the Spanish Civil War in one volume." In his books about the Spanish Civil War he used original Soviet sources to make discoveries about the role of the International Brigades in the Spanish Civil War and the Cold War, the Republican Political Repression or the foreign intervention in the conflict. In his work Paracuellos- Katin: El Genocidio de la Izquierda and in Checas de Madrid, Vidal provides an estimate of people murdered during the Spanish Civil War by leftist groups. Among his studies in History of Religions, especially praised has been his trilogy of founders of religions; "Jesus, el Judio" (Jesus, the Jew), "Buda, el Principe" (Buddha, the Prince), and "Mahoma el Guia" (Mohammed, the Guide).

He was the first translator of historical sources to Spanish such as The Egyptian history of Manetho, The Gnostic Gospels of Nag Hammadi, The Complete Narrative of Ancient Egypt and Komintern Documents.

The number of his books is over 100 and several have been on best seller lists and received historical and literary awards.

He also writes a column in the newspaper La Razón, and used to publish a series called Misterios de la Historia in Libertad Digital.

Political views and criticism 
Vidal is known for his far-right views on Islam, the Spanish Civil War and José Luis Rodríguez Zapatero's administration. In his books about the Spanish Civil War (La Guerra que Ganó Franco, Checas de Madrid and Paracuellos-Katyn, and El Genocidio de la Izquierda) he presents revisionist views of the conflict that conflict with mainstream historians, but are shared by fellow conservatives like Pío Moa and Ricardo de la Cierva. In El Genocidio de la Izquierda, Vidal provides an estimate of people murdered during the Spanish Civil War for practicing Catholicism. He has also claimed in his show that Islam and France have been Spain's main enemies throughout its history. He has the theory that May 68 was "a CIA operation to destabilize general De Gaulle", believes Basque is a "primitive language", and is skeptic about the theory of evolution. 

His detractors, including professional historians Ian Gibson and Ángel Viñas, accuse Vidal of lack of rigor and biased arguments. Vidal has been accused of misquoting historical sources and manipulating translations to support his own opinions.

Awards 
Vidal is a researcher in the international contexts of literary international commendation and international commendation in the Premio Humanism Fund of Hebraica, where he reconfirms his work on the defense of human rights in the organization of the Yad Vashem, the Holocaust Survivors (Venezuela), ORT (México), Juventus Contra la Intolerancia or the Territorial Terrorism Asociación.

 Award Harold Kregel, Book of the Year SEPA Apóstol para las naciones, Broadman & Holman (2022)
 Award Club de Periodistas de México (2021)
 Award Micrófono de plata (2005), ( Silver Microphone) 
 Award Gold Antenna. Antena de Oro (2005)
 Award of Communication of Hazte oír (2005)
 The Gold Pen Award by the Victims of Terrorism. Pluma de oro de las víctimas del terrorismo (2008)
 Award Spanish of the year by ADNE. Español del año de ADNE (2011)
 Award of the Israeli Embassy for better the relationship between Spain and Israel (2012)
 Award Torsón de oro (2013)
 Premio de Novela Histórica Ciudad de Cartagena (2000) by "La mandrágora de las doce lunas"
 Premio de biografía "Las Luces" (2002) for "Lincoln"
 Premio Jaén (2004) on "El último tren a Zúrich"
 The premiere of "CCEI" (2005)
 "Premio Espiritualidad" (2004) with "El tesamento del pescador", the most sold book of spiritual content in Spain 2004 after the Bible.
 Premio de Ciencias Sociales (2005) de la Academia de ciencias, tecnología, educación y humanidades.
 Premio de Novela in Ciudad de Torrevieja (Sept. 2005) in the "Los Hijos de la luz" and in the Jesse James neighborhood.
 Premio de Novela Historia Alfonso X El Sabio (2006), con la obra "El fuego del cielo."
 Premio Literari Algaba de Biografía, Autobiografía, Memorias e Investigaciones Históricas (2006), por la obra Pablo, el judío de Tarso.
 II Premio Finis Terrae por El caso Lutero. 2005: Premio de Novela Ciudad de Torrevieja, winner, Los Hijos de la Luz

References

External links 
 http://www.lalinterna.com (broken link)
 http://www.cesarvidal.com
 http://www.caminodelsur.com
 http://www.planetadeagostini.es/coleccionable/biblioteca-cesar-vidal.html

1958 births
Living people
20th-century Spanish historians
21st-century Spanish historians
Alfonso X El Sabio University alumni
Anti-Masonry in Spain
Spanish conspiracy theorists
Spanish evangelicals
Spanish Protestants
Writers from Madrid